The Old Harbor U.S. Life Saving Station is a historic maritime rescue station and museum, located at Race Point Beach in Provincetown, Massachusetts. Built in 1897, it was originally located at Nauset Beach near the entrance to Chatham Harbor in Chatham, Massachusetts. It was used by the United States Life-Saving Service (USLSS), and then by its successor, the United States Coast Guard (USCG), as the Old Harbor Coast Guard Station. The station was decommissioned in 1944, abandoned and sold as surplus in 1947, and was used as a private residence for the next twenty-six years.

The property returned to Federal ownership in 1973, acquired by the National Park Service as part of the Cape Cod National Seashore. The building was added to the National Register of Historic Places in 1975. Two years later, facing the threat of imminent destruction from extreme beach erosion, it was removed, cut in half, and floated by barge to Provincetown. The Park Service rehabilitated it and furnished it as it would have existed during its original use as a turn-of-the-century life-saving station. The Old Harbor U.S. Life Saving Station Museum opened at its new location in 1978.

History
The Old Harbor Station was built in 1897 by the United States Life-Saving Service. The design for this station was first created by USLSS architect George R. Tolman in 1893 for a prototype station on Lake Superior in Duluth, Minnesota. In all, the USLSS used that same design to build twenty-eight stations in the "Duluth style." This style resulted from a gradual evolution to replace the simple pitched-roof structures of 1872, and featured a large truncated, or jerkin-head gable roof. The rectangular floor plan was divided into two sections. One side of the building contained the living space, including a keeper's room, office, kitchen and mess room with sleeping quarters above for crew and rescuees. On the other side was a single-story, two-bay boat room. The Duluth departed even further from the norm by adding a large, rectangular, off-center, four-story lookout tower between the sections on the front of the building.

The first keeper was assigned on November 23, 1897. During its first five years of operation, crews from this station rescued 21 persons by surfboat, and extracted an additional 13 people by breeches buoy. The latter would be deployed when the sea was too rough for the surfboat to reach a vessel in distress.

In 1915, the USLSS was merged with the United States Revenue Cutter Service to form the United States Coast Guard. The renamed Old Harbor Coast Guard Station (Station #41) continued to operate until it was decommissioned in 1944. It was abandoned and sold as surplus on February 10, 1947, and used as a privately owned residence for the next twenty-six years.

In 1973, the station was returned to federal ownership, when the National Park Service acquired it as part of the surrounding Cape Cod National Seashore. That same year, the Historian of the National Park Service nominated the building for inclusion in the National Register of Historic Places, and it was so added in 1975.

In 1977, the former life-saving station was itself rescued from the sea, for the land upon which it stood was about to be reclaimed by the Atlantic Ocean. At present, the land upon which the structure once stood has been washed away, and the site is fully submerged.

Preservation and relocation
Nauset Beach, upon which this structure was originally located, is a barrier beach contained within a narrow spit of sand. This barrier beach is a high wave-energy environment that bears the brunt of severe winter storms in the Atlantic Ocean. That makes the location and configuration of the beach extremely variable, due to the natural processes of rapid erosion and accretion of sand.

By 1966, however, only  of beach separated the building from the high-water line, and by 1977, "waves were breaking against the foundation of the Old Harbor Station." It had become clear that the barrier beach was migrating westward.

In nominating this station for inclusion in the National Register of Historic Places, the National Park Service justified the need to preserve this structure:

In the fall of 1977, the National Park Service moved the station by cutting it in half, loading it onto a barge, and floating it to Provincetown. In February 1978, it weathered the record-breaking Blizzard of 1978 while still on the barge in Provincetown Harbor. Later that year, it was reassembled on a new foundation at Race Point Beach, rehabilitated, and opened to the public as a museum park exhibit.

In 2008, the station underwent a major rehabilitation, with an allocated budget of $489,000 to perform significant repairs to the interior and exterior of the building.

Present-day use

The Park Service has restored and furnished the station as it would have existed at the turn of the twentieth century, complete with the original Race Point surfboat and dory. During the summer season, it is open to the public daily as a self-guided museum exhibit each afternoon. Admission is included with standard beach access fees. In addition, every Thursday in July and August at 6p.m., park rangers conduct a live demonstration to reenact the historic "Beach Apparatus Drill", a weekly exercise used by the United States Life-Saving Service to train for the rescue of shipwrecked mariners. The drill includes deployment of a breeches buoy to effect a rescue.

See also
National Register of Historic Places listings in Barnstable County, Massachusetts
Race Point Light
Breeches buoy

References

National Register of Historic Places in Cape Cod National Seashore
Government buildings on the National Register of Historic Places in Massachusetts
Shingle Style architecture in Massachusetts
Buildings and structures in Barnstable, Massachusetts
Life-Saving Service stations
United States Coast Guard stations
Provincetown, Massachusetts
Chatham, Massachusetts
Life-Saving Service stations on the National Register of Historic Places
1897 establishments in Massachusetts
1978 establishments in Massachusetts
Buildings and structures completed in 1897
Museums in Barnstable County, Massachusetts